The 1964 Western Illinois Leathernecks football team represented Western Illinois University as a member of the Interstate Intercollegiate Athletic Conference (IIAC) during the 1964 NCAA College Division football season. They were led by fifth-year head coach Art Dufelmeier and played their home games at Hanson Field. The Leathernecks finished the season with a 6–3 record overall and a 3–1 record in conference play, sharing the IIAC title with Northern Illinois.

Schedule

References

Western Illinois
Western Illinois Leathernecks football seasons
Interstate Intercollegiate Athletic Conference football champion seasons
Western Illinois Leathernecks football